The VinFast VF 8 (formerly named VinFast VF e35 and VinFast VF32) is a mid-size crossover electric SUV manufactured and marketed by VinFast of Vingroup from 2022.

History
The VF 8 model made its debut in the second half of January 2021 in the electric car lineup of the Vietnamese automaker VinFast, which also served as the prelude for a planned expansion to global markets. First, VinFast will start collecting orders for the VF8 in September 2021 in the domestic Vietnamese market, delivering the first copies in February 2022. Later, VinFast plans to expand sales globally; the VF8 is scheduled to go on sale in June 2022 in markets including Europe, Australia, and the United States.

In the United States, VinFast has opened six dealerships in California on July 14, 2022 showing both the VF 8 and VF 9, with deliveries planned for fall 2022. An assembly plant in Chatham County, North Carolina is planned to break ground in late summer 2022 and begin production by 2024.

Design
The VF 8 is a crossover with round proportions combining chrome ornaments with a double strip of headlamps in the front of the body. Narrow LED daytime running lights are separated by a chrome bar, under which the rest of the headlamps are located. The car was styled by Pininfarina; VinFast's design team was led by director David Lyons.

Interior

The dashboard has a two-colour aesthetic, distinguished by avant-garde designed switches of driving modes in the centre tunnel, as well as a large multimedia system touch display. The traditional instrument panel has been replaced by the central multimedia screen and a head-up display projected on the windshield.

Drivetrain
The VF 8 is available with multiple traction motor arrangements.

The first batteries used in the VF 8 are from Samsung SDI. VinFast plans to add its own battery factory by August 2022. Both the "Eco" and "Plus" models are available with one of two traction battery options: "standard range", with 82 kW-hr usable, or "extended range", with 87.7 kW-hr usable (90 kW-hr gross). For the United States, the batteries are leased separately from the vehicle to reduce purchase costs and alleviate concerns regarding traction battery degradation. VinFast have stated they will replace a leased battery if it falls below 70% of initial capacity. Eventually, VinFast plan to offer the vehicle with a purchased battery.

References

External link 
 

Cars introduced in 2021
Crossover sport utility vehicles
Mid-size sport utility vehicles
Production electric cars
VF e35
Battery electric vehicles
Front-wheel-drive vehicles
All-wheel-drive vehicles